(born 1953) is a Japanese actor. Sometimes credited as Tatsumi Fuyamoto.

Partial filmography
 Zone Fighter as Garoga-Barans
 Ultraman Leo as Ultraman Leo, Ultra Seven
 Dinosaur War Izenborg as Aizenbo
 Terror of Mechagodzilla as Titanosaurus
 The Last Dinosaur as Triceratops

References

Bibliography
 

Japanese male film actors
Living people
1953 births